Eudonia subditella is a moth in the family Crambidae. It was described by Francis Walker in 1866. This species is endemic to New Zealand.

References

Moths described in 1866
Eudonia
Endemic fauna of New Zealand
Moths of New Zealand
Taxa named by Francis Walker (entomologist)
Endemic moths of New Zealand